Aamer Hanif (born October 4, 1967, in Lahore, Punjab) is a former Pakistani cricketer who played five ODIs between 1993 and 1995. All five of his international matches came against Sri Lanka although there was a two-year gap between his first match and the four other matches he played for his country. His international debut in 1993 consisted of trapping opening batsman Asanka Gurusinha lbw and making an unbeaten 17 to help his side win the match. He didn't receive another call-up until two years later when the touring team was Sri Lanka again. He played in four one-day matches not having much effect apart from in the third match of a three-match series when he scored his highest score of 36 not out and taking three wickets in a four wicket defeat to Sri Lanka. His performances weren't enough to merit a future call-up and he retired in 2005 from professional cricket with just five one-day international appearances to his name.

References 

 

Pakistan One Day International cricketers
1967 births
Living people
Pakistani cricketers
Karachi Whites cricketers
Pakistan Automobiles Corporation cricketers
Allied Bank Limited cricketers
Karachi Blues cricketers
Karachi cricketers
Cricketers from Lahore